Blue Movie (also known as Fuck) is a 1969 American erotic film written, produced and directed by Andy Warhol. It is the first adult erotic film depicting explicit sex to receive wide theatrical release in the United States, and is regarded as a seminal film in the Golden Age of Porn. It helped inaugurate the "porno chic" phenomenon, in which porn was publicly discussed by celebrities (like Johnny Carson and Bob Hope) and taken seriously by film critics (like Roger Ebert), in modern American culture, and later, in many other countries throughout the world. According to Warhol, Blue Movie was a major influence in the making of Last Tango in Paris, an internationally controversial erotic drama film starring Marlon Brando and released a few years after Blue Movie was made. Viva and Louis Waldon, playing themselves, starred in Blue Movie.

In 1970, Mona, the second adult erotic film that received a wide release, was shown. Afterwards, other adult films, including Boys in the Sand, Deep Throat, Behind the Green Door, and The Devil in Miss Jones, were released to continue the Golden Age of Porn, beginning with Blue Movie. In 2016, Blue Movie was shown at the Whitney Museum of American Art in Manhattan.

Development
The film includes dialogue about the Vietnam War, various mundane tasks and unsimulated sex, during a blissful afternoon in a New York City apartment (owned by art critic David Bourdon). The film was presented in the press as, "a film about the Vietnam War and what we can do about it." Warhol added, "the movie is about ... love, not destruction."

Warhol explained that the lack of a plot in Blue Movie was intentional:

According to Viva: "The Warhol films were about sexual disappointment and frustration: the way Andy saw the world, the way the world is, and the way nine-tenths of the population sees it, yet pretends they don’t."

Cast
 Louis Waldon as Himself
 Viva as Herself

Production
Andy Warhol described making Blue Movie as follows: "I'd always wanted to do a movie that was pure fucking, nothing else, the way Eat had been just eating and Sleep had been just sleeping. So in October '68 I shot a movie of Viva having sex with Louis Waldon. I called it just Fuck."

The film was supposedly filmed in a single three-hour session, with 30 minutes initially cut for the 140-minute version. The climactic section was shot in a 35-minute take. According to Variety, the film has only 10 minutes of actual sex.

The film acquired a blue/green tint when Warhol utilized film stock that was meant for filming with tungsten lights, and the daylight coming through a large apartment window resulted in the film's middle reel turning blue. According to Wheeler Winston Dixon, a filmmaker and scholar who attended the first screening of the film at Warhol's Factory in the spring of 1969:

Release

The film had a benefit screening on June 12, 1969, at the Elgin Theater in New York City. Variety reported that the film was the "first theatrical feature to actually depict intercourse". While it was initially shown at The Factory, Blue Movie was not presented to a wider audience until it opened at the New Andy Warhol Garrick Theater in New York City on July 21, 1969, with a running time of 105 minutes. The film was also screened at the Berkeley Repertory Theatre in California.

On its opening day in New York, the film grossed a house record $3,050, with a total of $16,200 for the week. Warhol received 90% of the gross, which recovered the film's $3,000 cost quickly. Viva, in Paris, finding that Blue Movie was getting a lot of attention, said, "Timothy Leary loved it. Gene Youngblood did too. He said I was better than Vanessa Redgrave and it was the first time a real movie star had made love on the screen. It was a real breakthrough."

Controversy
On July 31, 1969, the staff of the New Andy Warhol Garrick Theatre were arrested, and the film confiscated. The theater manager was eventually fined $250; afterwards, the manager said, "I don't think anyone was harmed by this movie ... I saw other pictures around town and this was a kiddie matinee compared to them." Warhol said, "What's pornography anyway? [...] The muscle magazines are called pornography, but they're really not. They teach you how to have good bodies [...] I think movies should appeal to prurient interests. I mean the way things are going now – people are alienated from one another. Blue Movie was real. But it wasn't done as pornography—it was done as an exercise, an experiment. But I really do think movies should arouse you, should get you excited about people, should be prurient. Prurience is part of the machine. It keeps you happy. It keeps you running."

Aftermath
Afterwards, in 1970, Warhol published Blue Movie in book form, with film dialogue and explicit stills, through Grove Press.

When Last Tango in Paris, an internationally controversial erotic drama film directed by Bernardo Bertolucci and starring Marlon Brando, was released in 1972, Warhol considered Blue Movie to be its inspiration.

Mona the Virgin Nymph, an erotic film depicting explicit sex, also received a mainstream theatrical release in the United States in 1970. Shortly thereafter, other adult films, such as Boys in the Sand, Deep Throat, Behind the Green Door, and The Devil in Miss Jones, were released, continuing the Golden Age of Porn that began with Blue Movie. In 1973, the phenomenon of porn being publicly discussed by celebrities (like Johnny Carson and Bob Hope) and taken seriously by film critics (like Roger Ebert), a development referred to by Ralph Blumenthal of The New York Times as "porno chic", began for the first time in modern American culture and later throughout the world.

Revival
In 2005, Blue Movie was publicly screened in New York City for the first time in over 30 years. In 2016, the film was shown at the Whitney Museum of American Art in Manhattan.

See also

 Andy Warhol filmography
 Art film
 Blow Job (1963) – Warhol film
 Eat (1964) – Warhol film
 Eating Too Fast (1966) – Warhol film
 Erotic art
 Erotic films in the United States
 Erotic photography
 Golden Age of Porn (1969–1984)
 Kiss (1963) – Warhol film
 List of American films of 1969
 Sex in film
 Sleep (1964) – Warhol film
 Unsimulated sex

References

Further reading
 
 
 James, James (1989), "Andy Warhol: The Producer as Author", in Allegories of Cinema: American Film in the 1960s pp. 58–84. Princeton: Princeton University Press.
 Koch, Stephen (1974; 2002): Stargazer. The Life, World and Films of Andy Warhol. London; updated reprint Marion Boyars, New York 2002, .

External links

 
 
 Blue Movie at the National Galleries of Scotland
 Blue Movie stars – Warholstars
 
 Images: Blue Movie – Andy Warhol
 Images: New Andy Warhol Garrick Theatre

1969 drama films
1969 films
1960s erotic drama films
1960s pornographic films
American erotic drama films
American independent films
American pornographic films
Films directed by Andy Warhol
Films set in New York City
Obscenity controversies in film
Films shot in 16 mm film
1969 independent films
1960s English-language films
1960s American films